I Am Who I Am is the debut record by former NHL hockey player Theo Fleury, released on October 16, 2015 through eOne Music Canada.

Track listing

References

2015 debut albums
Theo Fleury albums
E1 Music albums